The 1954 NCAA Tennis Championships were the 9th annual tournaments to determine the national champions of NCAA men's singles, doubles, and team collegiate tennis in the United States.

Two-time defending champions UCLA won the team championship, the Bruins' third such title. UCLA finished five points ahead of rivals USC (15–10) in the team standings.

Host site
This year's tournaments were contested at the University of Washington in Seattle, Washington.

Team scoring
Until 1977, the men's team championship was determined by points awarded based on individual performances in the singles and doubles events.

References

External links
List of NCAA Men's Tennis Champions

NCAA Division I tennis championships
NCAA Division I Tennis Championships
NCAA Division I Tennis Championships